The Avian Rio is a British high-wing, single-place, recreational hang glider, designed by Steve Elkins and Neil Hammerton and produced by Avian Limited of Hope Valley, Derbyshire.

Design and development
The Rio was designed as a sports glider for recreational local and cross-country flying, while still being light in weight and easy to fly.

The Rio 15 model the sole version produced and is made from aluminum tubing, with the wing covered in Dacron sailcloth. Its  span wing has a nose angle of 120° and an aspect ratio of 6:1. The model number indicates the wing area in square metres.

The glider can be broken down to a  package,  in length for ground transportation on a car top.

Specifications (Rio 15)

References

External links
Official webpage archive on Archive.org

Hang gliders